Threat (2006) is an independent film about a straightedge "hardcore kid" and a hip hop revolutionary whose friendship is doomed by the intolerance of their respective street tribes. It is an ensemble film of kids and young adults living in the early-to-mid-90s era of New York City's all-time highest ever murder rate, each of them suffering from a sense of doom brought on by dealing with HIV, racism, sexism, class struggle, and general nihilism.

The intellectual issues are played out amid an aesthetic of raw ultraviolence that has earned director Matt Pizzolo both accolades and condemnations (such as Film Threat's rave review stating "great art should assail the status quo, and that is what Pizzolo and Nisa's film has skillfully accomplished"  in contrast to Montreal Film Journal's scathing review saying the film "openly glorifies murderous revolt, literally telling the audience to go out and beat up random people, just because"). 

Unlike past urban dramas, the film does not outright condemn its characters' violent outbursts. Although it does show harsh consequences for acts of violence, numerous critics have pointed out that it is unclear whether or not the film intends to glorify violence and/or class conflict.

Summary

White, straight edge hardcore kid, Jim (Carlos Puga), and black, hip-hop radical, Fred (Keith Middleton), become friends living on New York's Lower East Side - both of them with the hope that their newfound brotherhood will bring solidarity to their disparate communities. Instead, the alliance triggers a violent race riot that spills into the city streets with devastatingly tragic consequences.

Cast
 Carlos Puga as Jim
 Keith Middleton as Fred
 Rebekka Takamizu as Mekky
 Kamouflage as Desmond
 Katie Nisa as Kat
 Neil Rubenstein as Ruby
 David R. Fisher as Marco
 Tony Dreannan as Tony
 Rachel Rosen as Punk Rock Girl
 Slug as Slug

Production
The film was produced by Kings Mob, a team of neophyte filmmakers in their late teen and early 20s. Director Matt Pizzolo was the eldest member of the crew: 19 years old when he wrote the script and 21 when shooting commenced. Pizzolo met filmmaking partner Katie Nisa at NYU's Tisch School of the Arts. Both were enrolled in the school's Dramatic Writing Program. Pizzolo left the program and lived out of a backpack in Manhattan's Lower East Side while writing the first draft of Threat.

Still at NYU, Nisa recruited film student Benjamin Brancato to join the project as cinematographer and NYU business school student Carlos Puga to play the lead role. Pizzolo recruited fellow Long Island native Ben Knight who was still a teenager at the time and put him to work as a production designer for the film. Nisa also cast Keith Middleton when she saw him walking on St. Mark's Place. Unknown to Nisa, Middleton was on his way to perform in the popular dance show Stomp.

Kings Mob shot the film in a DIY style that sharply contrasted with other more polished independent films of the mid 90s (sometimes referred to as Indiewood). The DIY style focused less on aesthetic and more on authenticity. This style later picked up traction with various DiY-Video movements including the mumblecore scene of the 2000s. Unlike most movies of the DIY-Video era to follow, Threat was shot on 16mm film.

Pizzolo interned at NYC film co-op Film/Video Arts, where he cleaned up after film classes in exchange for free access to cameras and lights while not in use. Nisa waitressed at East Village diner 7A to pay for production supplies that "couldn't be borrowed or stolen." Initially, sound recording was to be handled by one of Nisa's film student friends. When he could not make it to the first day of production, he instead gave Nisa a 15-minute lesson on how to run the nagra. She went on to be the film's sole sound recordist for the first months of production.

At the start of production, the crew consisted solely of Pizzolo, Nisa, Brancato, and Knight but over the course of production it grew to include over 200 young people from 5 different countries.

Although shot without permits on a shoestring budget by a team of non-professional first-time filmmakers, some critics have compared Threat to such iconic films as The Warriors, Do the Right Thing, American History X, Slacker, Clerks, Romper Stomper, Kids, Doom Generation, and Suburbia.

Critical response ranged from "easily one of the most important films of the decade" to "there is no explanation, no logic, and no reckoning."

Produced largely in the New York metalcore and hardcore punk scene, Threat features guest appearances by members of Most Precious Blood from the Trustkill Records label. Trustkill also contributed music to the film's score from Most Precious Blood, Bleeding Through, Eighteen Visions, and Terror. Most of the film's score, however, was composed by Alec Empire and his band Atari Teenage Riot. The score was constructed by jungle-music producer queque.

In keeping with the punk and DiY ideologies of the movie and their production company, Pizzolo and Nisa eschewed distribution offers from Hollywood studios.

Initially, the film was released as an underground VHS tape and toured across the US and Europe, playing at non-traditional venues such as record stores, hip hop clubs, skateparks, and music festivals.

One of the more notable non-traditional screenings took place during the Sundance Film Festival at a Doc Martens shoe store across the street from Sundance's flagship Egyptian Theater. It was here that The Daily Telegraph documented the sold-out screenings during Sundance as a cover story in its Saturday Magazine, leading the filmmakers to be invited on a European tour with the film. When they returned home, Threat screenings were added as an attraction on the Van's Warped Tour.

Years of touring culminated with an appearance at the Coachella Valley Music and Arts Festival, where music-video distributor HIQI Media signed on to distribute the film to theaters.

Soon after, Pizzolo formed the punk cinema label Halo 8 and released Threat on DVD through a distribution deal with Sony Pictures and RED Music, who distributed the film's soundtracks.

Awards
In October 2006, Threat won the Grand Prize for Best Feature at the Lausanne Underground Film and Music Festival in Lausanne, Switzerland. The award was presented to the filmmakers on stage by Crispin Glover.

In April 2007, Threat won the "First Feature Film - Special Mention" prize at the Rome Independent Film Festival in Rome, Italy.

Soundtracks

Threat: Original Motion Picture Soundtrack
Threats soundtrack consists mainly of digital hardcore courtesy of Alec Empire's DHR label, and metalcore courtesy of Trustkill Records. The soundtrack was released by HALO 8 Entertainment in January 2006.

Track listing
 "Night of Violence" – Alec Empire
 "Start the Riot" – Atari Teenage Riot
 "Into the Death" – Atari Teenage Riot
 "Rage" – Atari Teenage Riot feat. Tom Morello & D-Stroy
 "Sick to Death" – Atari Teenage Riot
 "Get Up While You Can" – Atari Teenage Riot
 "Gotta Get Out" – Alec Empire
 "Common Enemy" – Panic DHH
 "Wanna Peel" – EC8OR
 "Number Seven with a Bullet" – Bleeding Through
 "The Great Red Shift" – Most Precious Blood
 "One Hell of a Prize Fighter" – Eighteen Visions
 "Overcome" – Terror
 "Drone" – Eyes Like Knives
 "mPathik" – queque
 "heVn" – queque
 "I Am a Threat" – King David
 "Kids Are United" – Atari Teenage Riot

Threat: Music That Inspired the Movie 
In addition to the Threat soundtrack, Halo8 produced and released the compilation Threat: Music That Inspired the Movie. In the tradition of soundtracks featuring collaborations/remixes, from such films as Spawn and Judgment Night, the album consists of mashups of hardcore punk and metalcore with breakcore. The album was released by HALO 8 Entertainment in January 2006.

Track listing 
 "Pandemic" – Most Precious Blood vs. Alec Empire
 "World at War" – Agnostic Front vs. Schizoid
 "Ghost in the Machine" – Inside Out vs. Oktopus from Dälek
 "World Ablaze" (Threat mix) – Killswitch Engage vs. Edgey
 "Overkill" – Terror vs. Enduser
 "Champagne Enemaz" – Eighteen Visions vs. Otto von Schirach
 "Zolobovine" – Gorilla Biscuits vs. Defragmentation
 "Cannibal Kitten" – The Icarus Line vs. The End
 "Slapped with an X" – Vision of Disorder vs. The Tyrant
 "Bring It" – Judge vs. Bill Youngman
 "Stalwart Carapace" – Youth of Today vs. Edgey
 "Deathbed" – Bleeding Through vs. Hecate
 "I Know That You're Lying" – Today Is The Day vs. darph/nadeR
 "Star Buried in My Yard" – Glassjaw vs. Enduser
 "Don't Step" – Minor Threat vs. Holocaust

References

External links
 
 
 
 Threat Synopsis and reviews of the movie at threatfilm.com

2006 films
American independent films
Punk films
2000s English-language films
1990s English-language films
1990s American films
2000s American films